Heaven Only Knows may refer to:
 Heaven Only Knows (1947 film)
 Heaven Only Knows (album), an album by Teddy Pendergrass
 "Heaven Only Knows" (Emmylou Harris song), a 1989 song by Emmylou Harris
 "Heaven Only Knows" (k-os song), a 2002 song by k-os
 "Heaven Only Knows", a song by Electric Light Orchestra from their 1986 album Balance of Power
 "Heaven Only Knows", a song by Richard Marx from his 1987 self-titled debut album

See also
 Heaven Knows (disambiguation)
 "Heaven" (John Legend song), whose opening words are "Heaven only knows"
 "Only Heaven Knows", a song by Eddy Grant from Going for Broke